Collplesiops is a genus of ray-finned fish from the family Plesiopidae, the longfins or roundheads. They are found in the Indo-Pacific.

Species
There are two species currently recognised in the genus Calloplesiops:

 Calloplesiops altivelis Steindachner, 1903 (Comet)
 Calloplesiops argus Fowler & B.A. Bean, 1930

References

Plesiopinae